The 1999 PBA Commissioner's Cup Finals was the best-of-7 basketball championship series of the 1999 PBA Commissioner's Cup, and the conclusion of the conference playoffs. The Formula Shell Zoom Masters and San Miguel Beermen played for the 73rd championship contested by the league.

The San Miguel Beermen halted Formula Shell Zoom Masters' two straight title-winning runs and won their first championship in five years, under coach Jong Uichico, ushering a new era in their franchise history.

Danny Seigle won his first rookie Finals MVP in Commissioner's Cup Finals.

Qualification

Series scoring summary

Games summary

Game 1

Game 2

Game 3

Shell squandered a 15-point lead early in the third quarter but got big baskets from Benjie Paras and import John Best in the extension period. Paras and Best each scored 27 points, Best knocked in five points in overtime, including two crucial charities off Danny Seigle's offensive foul with 12.6 seconds left, Best' two free throws gave Shell an 88-84 lead.

Game 4

Victor Pablo and Noy Castillo rose to the challenge with Pablo scoring 23 points, seven of them in the final 12 minutes, and Castillo's three-point shot down the stretch gave Shell their biggest lead at 68-55.

Game 5

Game 6

The beermen ripped the game wide open in the second quarter when they held the Zoom Masters to only three field goals and a charity while pouring in the shots for a 33-21 halftime advantage, San Miguel entered the fourth period with a 55-44 lead, But John Best, Victor Pablo and Noy Castillo combined to pull Shell within 59-63 with 5:35 remaining, the beermen came through with a 7-2 run with Freddie Abuda making a key putback and Terquin Mott hitting a baseline turnaround shot and a thunderous dunk over Benjie Paras. Danny Seigle won on his first rookie Finals MVP and San Miguel captures on his first championship 12th title

Rosters

Broadcast notes

References

External links
PBA official website

1999 PBA season
1999
San Miguel Beermen games
Shell Turbo Chargers games
PBA Commissioner's Cup Finals